The Nizamabad Municipal Corporation (MCN or NMC) is the local governing body, administering the city of Nizamabad in the Indian state of Telangana. The municipal corporation consists of democratically elected members, is headed by a mayor and administers the city's governance, infrastructure and administration.

History
The municipality was constituted in 1931 and upgraded as special grade municipality in 1987. The Nizamabad Municipality was upgraded as Nizamabad Municipal Corporation on 5 March 2005

Administration
The Municipal Corporation building is located at Yellamagutta in the city. Currently there are 60 divisions in Nizamabad. The municipal corporation administrates the jurisdiction of the district headquarters. It also administers the E-governance services of the district. The last municipal elections were held in January 2020.

Wards
Reorganized wards and divisions constituted by Nizamabad Municipal Corporation from the January 2020 elections:

See also
 Nizamabad Urban Development Authority

References

Nizamabad, Telangana
Municipal corporations in Telangana
Local government in Telangana
1931 establishments in India
2005 establishments in Andhra Pradesh